Inaba (written:  or ) is a Japanese surname. Notable people with the surname include: 

, Japanese shogi player
, Japanese singer
, Japanese baseball player
, Japanese video game producer and designer
Carrie Ann Inaba (born 1968), American dancer, choreographer, actress, television host, and singer
, Japanese professional wrestler
Darryl S. Inaba (born 1946), American pharmacologist
, Japanese powerlifter
, Japanese bobsledder
, Japanese footballer
Ian Inaba, (born 1971), American film and music video director, producer, and journalist
, Japanese biologist
, Japanese swimmer
, Singapore-born Japanese businessman
, Japanese vocalist
, Japanese futsal player
, Japanese daimyō
, Japanese daimyō
, Japanese daimyō
, Japanese daimyō
, Japanese daimyō
, Japanese daimyō
, Japanese military officer
, Japanese daimyō
, Japanese daimyō
, Japanese daimyō
, Japanese daimyō
, Japanese writer and poet
, Japanese voice actor
, Japanese politician
, Japanese sport wrestler
, Japanese samurai
, Japanese actor
, Japanese actor

Fictional characters
Inaba, a character from the Japanese manga and anime series Urusei Yatsura
Inaba Himeko, a character from the Japanese light novel series Kokoro Connect
Reisen Udongein Inaba and Tewi Inaba, characters from the Touhou Project video games
Kageroza Inaba, an anime-exclusive character from the 15th season of the Bleach anime, in the Gotei 13 Invading Army arc

See also
Inaba clan, a Japanese samurai clan

Japanese-language surnames